Klein Priebus (Sorbian: Přibuzk) is a small German village located in Saxony. It is part of the municipality Krauschwitz. Before World War II the village was located in the Province of Lower Silesia. The town is located opposite the Polish town of Przewóz.

Towns in Saxony
Populated places in Görlitz (district)